Farmaki is a village of the Elassona municipality. Before the 2011 local government reform it was a part of the municipality of Sarantaporo. The 2011 census recorded 156 inhabitants in the village. Farmaki is a part of the community of Tsapournia.

History 
The settlement is recorded as village and as "Farmaki" in the Ottoman Maliyeden Müdevver Defter number 66 dating to 1470.

Economy
The population of Farmaki is occupied in animal husbandry and agriculture.

Population
According to the 2011 census, the population of the settlement of Farmaki  was 156 people, a decrease of almost 27% compared with the population of the previous census of 2001.

See also
 List of settlements in the Larissa regional unit

References

Populated places in Larissa (regional unit)